Address Boulevard is a 73-storey  hotel in Downtown Dubai in Dubai, United Arab Emirates. It has 196 five-star-hotel rooms and 523 serviced residences. It is on the list of tallest buildings in Dubai and the list of tallest buildings in the world. It has a restaurant and 3 pools and has views of the Burj Khalifa.

The hotel permanently showcases 251 specially-commissioned original artworks by 48 internationally renowned artists.

History
The project was developed by Emaar Properties beginning in 2012. The serviced residences sold out on the day of the launch of sales in September 2012.

The hotel opened in 2017.

In 2018, Emaar sold its hotels in Dubai, including Address Boulevard, to Abu Dhabi National Hotels for $598 million.

References

Residential skyscrapers in Dubai
Architecture in Dubai
The Address Hotels + Resorts
Hotels in Dubai
Skyscraper hotels in Dubai